Saima Akhtar Bharwana (born April 24, 1969 in Shorkot) is a Pakistani female politician. She is a former Member of National Assembly of Pakistan form Constituency NA-90 (Jhang-V).

Early life 
Akhtar was born on April 24, 1969 in Shorkot, Punjab to an agriculturist. In 1990, she graduated in B.A from Lahore College for Women University.

Career 
She successfully ran for the Parliament in election 2008 from the constituency NA-90. She then joined Pakistan Muslim League (Q). Later in 2012 she joined Pakistan Muslim League (N). She was a runner up in 2013 Pakistani general election.

References

External links 
 Saima Akhtar Bharwana at the ECP

1969 births
Living people
Pakistan Muslim League (N) politicians
People from Jhang District
Lahore College for Women University alumni
Independent politicians in Pakistan
21st-century Pakistani women politicians
Women members of the National Assembly of Pakistan